Harold Pond (19 April 1917 – 1990) was an English professional footballer who played in the Football League for Carlisle United as a left half.

Personal life 
Pond worked at the Folland Aircraft factory in Hampshire during the Second World War.

References 

English Football League players
Clapton Orient F.C. wartime guest players
English footballers
1917 births
1990 deaths
Association football wing halves
People from Kilnhurst
Barnsley F.C. players
Carlisle United F.C. players
Boston United F.C. players
Portsmouth F.C. wartime guest players
Reading F.C. wartime guest players
Crystal Palace F.C. wartime guest players
Aldershot F.C. wartime guest players